is a 2019 Japanese yakuza comedy-drama film, directed by Keinosuke Hara and based on the Jasmine Gyuh manga of the same name. The film stars Nana Asakawa, Ruka Matsuda, Akane Sakanoue and Koichi Iwaki. Distributed by Toei, it made its premiere on February 8, 2019 in Japan. The staff and cast of the film also returned for a six-episode live-action television series set before during and after the film, featuring Arisa Komiya, that premiered on February 17, 2019.

Plot
After learning from their imprisoned boss (Ren Osugi) that he has decided to remain in prison and eventually die, yakuza blood brothers Kentaro Yamamoto (Jin Shirasu), Ryo Tachibana (Masato Hanazawa) and Kazuhiko Sugihara (Reiya Masaki) swear to do their new boss, "Mad Dog" Kimanjiro Inugane (Koichi Iwaki) proud. Electing to do so by taking out their chief competition (Hitoshi Ozawa), the trio fight their way into their compound, only to learn after being captured that their new boss had already reached a truce. After being returned to him, the trio beg forgiveness. Offered the choice to commit seppuku and sell their organs, or go to Thailand to undergo gender reassignment surgery and train to become idols, the trio choose the latter, and after intensive training respectively debut as Airi (Natsumi Okamoto), Mari (Ruka Matsuda) and Chika (Akane Sakanoue), the Gokudols ("Yakuza Idols"). As their popularity rises, Airi discovers her ex-girlfriend of six years, whom they had left to live a life without crime, to now have a five-year-old daughter (who they believe to be their own child) who is a fan of hers, and struggles with whether or not she should face them, Mari develops a relationship with her lesbian nurse treating hemorrhoids resulting from her surgery, while Chika enters into a relationship with Inugane's and the Gokudols' assistant Kimura (Tetsuya Sugaya), the latter two being aware of their past, while the trio struggle with their new purpose. After meeting once again with their old boss and explaining their new circumstances, the trio are encouraged to embrace their new selves and become the best they can be, after which time they embrace their public image, visiting cake shops and reluctantly publicly protesting the yakuza.

Learning of the upcoming J-Pop Summit, the Gokudols audition for the corrupt Harvey Weinstein (Dori Sakurada), who drugs the group with the intent of sexually assaulting them after promising Chika the starring role in his new movie while they were awake. After the trio proceed to instead become incredibly drunk and assault Weinstein after learning of his intentions and seeing him strike his interrupting girlfriend, he cancels the Summit, donating its funding to charities owned by him as damage control to counter reports of the assault, to which he refers as "fake news", before running a smear campaign against the Gokudols which results in the majority of their upcoming gigs being canceled. However, having inspired Weinstein's former girlfriend after beating him up, herself an idol, she agrees to fund the Summit herself, inviting the Gokudols to perform. As public opinion turns against him, an outraged Weinstein, after having had a series of private investigators follow the Gokudols, has Airi's purported family, Mari's nurse girlfriend and Chika's assistant boyfriend Kimura kidnapped in order to blackmail the Gokudols to not attend. Upon being informed of the kidnappings, the Gokudols proceed to the location Weinstein asked them to meet, where they attack the rival yakuza hired by Weinstein to serve as his henchmen, violently incapacitating all of them using a combination of their yakuza and idol tactics. After rescuing the assistant, Chika is shot in the chest by Weinstein and apparently dies. Determined and furious, Airi takes up a katana dropped by one of Weinstein's henchmen and uses it to take out his remaining bodyguards, stopping it mere inches from his face before returning to check on the dying Chika. Weinstein, enraged at his treatment at the hands of mere "idols", picks up the katana and attempts to cut off Airi's head while she is distracted, only to be struck by a firework rocket launcher and incapacitated by Inugane, who had followed the Gokudols and rescued Weinstein's hostages. After cheerfully informing the group that he is proud of them as both idols and yakuza, Inugane then informs them to proceed to the Summit, shooting at their feet to startle them and give them adrenaline rushes, inadvertently reviving Chika, who had been merely knocked out by Weinstein's bullets, physically protected from them by having been wearing a metallic kevlar bra. Celebrating, the Gokudols run several miles to the Summit, changing en route, where they energetically perform as its grand finale.

In a mid-credits scene, Airi discovers their ex-girlfriend to have married another immediately after she had left them, and that their child is not her own, fainting upon learning the news. In a post-credits scene, after Weinstein begs Inugane not to kill them while held at gunpoint, promising to do "anything", he sends him to Thailand for surgery and training to become an idol themselves.

Cast

 Natsumi Okamoto as Airi Yamamoto
 Jin Shirasu as Kentaro Yamamoto
 Ruka Matsuda as Mari Tachibana
 Masato Hanazawa as Ryo Tachibana
 Akane Sakanoue as Chika Sugihara
 Reiya Masaki as Kazuhiko Sugihara
 Koichi Iwaki as Boss / Teacher / Director "Mad Dog" Kimanjiro Inugane
 Tetsuya Sugaya as the Assistant Kimura
 Dori Sakurada as Harvey Weinstein
 Ren Osugi as the Old Boss
 Hitoshi Ozawa as the Rival Boss
 Arisa Komiya as Yui Nakamura (television series only)

Soundtrack
Ryujin Kiyoshi performs the opening theme song "Koishite Koishite Yashinatte" in the six-episode television series, with a different artist performing the ending theme song each episode.

Release
The film made its world premiere in Japan on February 8, 2019. The staff and cast of the film also returned for a six-episode live-action television series that premiered on February 17, 2019, airing on the MBS and TBS "Dramaism" programming block.

Reception
The movie earned over $1,547,000 in its opening weekend at the Japanese box office, where it grossed  during its theatrical run.

References

External links

 Back Street Girls: Gokudols Subtitled Trailer 
 

2019 films
2010s comedy television series
Japanese idols
2019 comedy-drama films
Manga adapted into films
Manga adapted into television series
Japanese comedy television series
Japanese comedy-drama films
Japanese mystery drama films
Yakuza films
2010s Japanese-language films
Live-action films based on manga
Transgender-related television shows
Bisexuality-related films
2010s Japanese LGBT-related television series
Transgender-related films
LGBT-related comedy-drama films
2019 LGBT-related films
Japanese LGBT-related films
LGBT-related animated films
2010s Japanese films